Ray Davey is a former association football goalkeeper who represented New Zealand at international level.

Davey made his full All Whites debut in a 5–6 loss to South Africa on 28 June 1947 and ended his international playing career with four A-international caps to his credit, his final cap an appearance in a 1–4 loss to South Africa on 17 July 1947.

References 

Year of birth missing (living people)
Living people
New Zealand association footballers
New Zealand international footballers
Association football goalkeepers